Cnoc Meadha (also Cnoc Meádha Siuil referring to its location on the plain of Maigh Seóla, and variously spelled Knockmagha, Knockma, or Knock Ma) is a hill west of Tuam, County Galway, in Ireland.

It is said in legend to be the residence of Finnbheara, the king of the Connacht fairies. Of two large cairns on the hill, one was thought to be the burial-place of Finnbheara and the other of Queen Medb, whose name may be transformed in the name Cnoc Meadha. Knockma Hill is topped with prehistoric cairns.

G. H. Kinahan wrote of the place:

In Evans-Wentz's classic The Fairy-Faith in Celtic Countries, his informant Mr John Glynn, the town clerk of Tuam, mentions that:

References

Geography of Galway (city)
Irish folklore
Mountains and hills of County Galway